Stigmella morivora is a moth of the family Nepticulidae. It was described by Hirano in 2010. It is known from Japan (Honshū).

The larvae feed on Morus bombycis. They probably mine the leaves of their host plant.

References

Nepticulidae
Moths described in 2010
Moths of Japan